The 2010 FIBA Europe Under-20 Championship was the 13th edition of the FIBA Europe Under-20 Championship. The cities of Zadar, Crikvenica and Makarska, in Croatia, hosted the tournament. France won their first title.

Netherlands and the Czech Republic were relegated to Division B.

Teams

Squads

Preliminary round
The sixteen teams were allocated in four groups of four teams each.

Group A

Group B

Group C

Group D

Qualifying round
The twelve teams were allocated in two groups of six teams each. The results of the games between the teams from the same group in the Preliminary Round were taken into account for the ranking in this round.

Group E

Group F

Classification round

Group G

Knockout stage

9th–12th playoffs

Championship bracket

5th–8th playoffs

Final standings

Stats leaders

Points

Rebounds

Assists

All-Tournament Team
  Andrew Albicy (MVP)
  Nikos Pappas
  Kostas Papanikolaou
  Mario Delaš
  Nikola Mirotić

References
FIBA Archive
FIBA Europe Archive

FIBA U20 European Championship
2010–11 in European basketball
2010–11 in Croatian basketball
International youth basketball competitions hosted by Croatia